Anthea, "blossom" in Greek, was an epithet of the Classical Greek goddess Hera, and is used as a female given name in English. It may refer to:

Anthea Askey (1933–1999), British actress
Anthea Bell (1936–2018), British translator of literary works 
Anthea Benton, British television commercial and music video director
Anthea Butler (born 1960), American professor
Anthea Fraser (born 1930), novelist
Anthea Joseph  (1924–1981), British publisher
Anthea Larken (born 1938), British director of the Women's Royal Naval Service
Anthea Millett (1941-2022), British health administrator
Anthea Phillipps (born 1956), British botanist
Anthea Redfern (born 1948), British television host
Anthea Stewart (born 1944), Zimbabwean field hockey player
Anthea Sylbert (born 1937), American costume designer
Anthea Turner (born 1960), British television presenter and media personality

Fictional characters
Anthea, home world (which is dying due lack of water) of the fictitious alien Thomas Jerome Newton, the protagonist of Walter Tevis's sci-fi novel The Man Who Fell to Earth. In the novel's 1976 film adaptation by Nicolas Roeg, Newton was played by David Bowie and the scenes taking place on dying Anthea were shot at White Sands, New Mexico.
Anthea Hopper, a minor supporting character in the French animated show, Code Lyoko and Code Lyoko: Evolution. She was the wife of Professor Waldo Franz Shaffer, and is the long-lost mother of protagonist Aelita. Her second husband is Professor Lowell Tryon; the villain in the live-action seuqel
In Men Behaving Badly, Valerie Minifie plays Anthea, an employee at Gary's security firm.
In BBC'S Sherlock (TV series), the assistant of Mycroft Holmes calls herself Anthea
Anthy Himemiya is one of the main characters of the manga Revolutionary Girl Utena

See also
Samantha, presumed to be a combination of Samuel and Anthea

Feminine given names
Given names derived from plants or flowers